David López Silva (born 9 October 1989) is a Spanish professional footballer who plays as a defensive midfielder for Girona FC.

He spent most of his career in two spells at Espanyol, making over 225 appearances. He also played for two years with Napoli in Italy's Serie A.

Club career

Espanyol
Born in Barcelona, Catalonia, López finished his youth career with local RCD Espanyol, and made his senior debut with the reserves in the 2008–09 season, in Tercera División. In August 2009 he was loaned to Terrassa FC of the Segunda División B, being a regular starter but suffering relegation.

López returned to Espanyol in June 2010, and made his main squad – and La Liga – debut on 26 September, coming on as a late substitute in a 1–0 home win against CA Osasuna. He continued to appear more regularly with the B side, however.

On 11 August 2011, López was loaned to CD Leganés in the third tier. A year later, he joined Segunda División club SD Huesca on the same basis.

López returned to Espanyol  on 16 June 2013 after the Pericos recalled him. He scored his first goal in the top flight on 24 August, his team's first in a 3–1 home victory over Valencia CF.

Napoli

On 31 August 2014, S.S.C. Napoli confirmed López' signing on a five-year contract. He made his Serie A debut on 21 September, playing the full 90 minutes and being booked in a 1–0 defeat at Udinese Calcio. He won the Supercoppa Italiana on 22 December in Qatar; he made a mistake for Carlos Tevez of Juventus F.C. to open the scoring, though his side won on a penalty shootout after a 2–2 draw.

López scored his first competitive goal for the Italians (from 39 appearances) on 7 May 2015, putting his team ahead in an eventual 1–1 home draw against FC Dnipro Dnipropetrovsk in the semi-finals of the UEFA Europa League.

Espanyol return
On 26 August 2016, López returned to Espanyol on a four-year deal. During most of his second spell he was utilised by manager Quique Sánchez Flores as a central defender and, from that position, he scored in a 4–1 away loss to FC Barcelona in the Derbi barceloní on 18 December.

In August 2018, López agreed to an extension until 2023. He scored a top-flight best of four goals in the 2019–20 campaign, but his team were relegated; this started with the opener on 4 January in a 2–2 draw with Barcelona at the RCDE Stadium. On 23 February, he was sent off for the first time for the club, for two yellow cards in the opening 25 minutes of the 2–1 defeat at Real Valladolid.

López remained a regular as Espanyol won promotion as champions in May 2021. He scored once that season, equalising in a 3–1 win at CD Castellón on 26 March.

On 10 June 2022, López left as his contract was expiring. He featured in 237 official matches, scoring 13 times.

Girona
López remained in the top flight and his native region on 25 July 2022, on a two-year contract at Girona FC.

International career
López was never capped by Spain at any level. He played one game for the unofficial Catalonia team on 30 December 2013, as a substitute in a 4–1 win over Cape Verde.

Honours
Napoli
Supercoppa Italiana: 2014

Espanyol
Segunda División: 2020–21

References

External links

1989 births
Living people
Spanish footballers
Footballers from Barcelona
Association football midfielders
Association football utility players
La Liga players
Segunda División players
Segunda División B players
Tercera División players
CF Damm players
RCD Espanyol B footballers
RCD Espanyol footballers
Terrassa FC footballers
CD Leganés players
SD Huesca footballers
Girona FC players
Serie A players
S.S.C. Napoli players
Catalonia international footballers
Spanish expatriate footballers
Expatriate footballers in Italy
Spanish expatriate sportspeople in Italy